Ceraurinella is an extinct genus of trilobite in the family Cheiruridae. There are about 19 described species in Ceraurinella.

Species
These 19 species belong to the genus Ceraurinella:

 † Ceraurinella arctica Ludvigsen, 1979
 † Ceraurinella brevispina Ludvigsen, 1979
 † Ceraurinella buttsi Cooper
 † Ceraurinella chondra Whittington & Evitt, 1953
 † Ceraurinella kingstoni Chatterton & Ludvigsen, 1976
 † Ceraurinella latipyga Shaw, 1968
 † Ceraurinella longispina Ludvigsen, 1979
 † Ceraurinella media Ludvigsen, 1979
 † Ceraurinella nahanniensis Chatterton & Ludvigsen, 1976
 † Ceraurinella necra Ludvigsen, 1979
 † Ceraurinella oepiki Edgecombe et al., 1999
 † Ceraurinella polydorus (Billings, 1865)
 † Ceraurinella pompilia (Billings, 1865)
 † Ceraurinella seriata Ludvigsen, 1979
 † Ceraurinella templetoni
 † Ceraurinella tenuisculptus (Bradley, 1930)
 † Ceraurinella typa Cooper, 1953
 † Ceraurinella zhoui Edgecombe et al., 1999

References

Cheiruridae
Articles created by Qbugbot